was an early 1970s J-pop band made up of 5 hafu members including Maria Mori, Eva Mary and Luna Takamura.

Golden Half was promoted by Watanabe Productions and was composed in September 1970 to sing and go-go dance on the Fuji TV show BEAT POP. They often sang western pop songs in Japanese and split in 1974. The band appeared in the nightclub scenes in Yasuharu Hasebe's Stray Cat Rock: Sex Hunter where they performed their hit song Kiiroi Sakuranbo ("Yellow Cherry").

References

Musical groups established in 1970
Musical groups disestablished in 1974
Japanese pop music groups
Musical quintets